Bezirk Grieskirchen is a district of the state of 
Upper Austria in Austria.

Municipalities 
Towns (Städte) are indicated in boldface; market towns (Marktgemeinden) in italics; suburbs, hamlets and other subdivisions of a municipality are indicated in small characters.
Aistersheim (786)
Bad Schallerbach (3287)
Bruck-Waasen (2302)
Eschenau im Hausruckkreis (1176)
Gallspach (2575)
Gaspoltshofen (3609)
Geboltskirchen (1412)
Grieskirchen (4807)
Haag am Hausruck (2047)
Heiligenberg (710)
Hofkirchen an der Trattnach (1510)
Kallham (2543)
Kematen am Innbach (1262)
Meggenhofen (1236)
Michaelnbach (1232)
Natternbach (2338)
Neukirchen am Walde (1686)
Neumarkt im Hausruckkreis (1447)
Peuerbach (2234)
Pollham (915)
Pötting (541)
Pram (1840)
Rottenbach (1009)
Schlüßlberg (2998)
Sankt Agatha (2119)
Sankt Georgen bei Grieskirchen (967)
Sankt Thomas (460)
Steegen (1124)
Taufkirchen an der Trattnach (2093)
Tollet (871)
Waizenkirchen (3660)
Wallern an der Trattnach (2874)
Weibern (1587)
Wendling (833)

External links 
Official site

 
Districts of Upper Austria